This is a list of films produced in Burkina Faso by year.


1970s

1980s

1990s

2000s

 
Films
Burkina Faso
Lists of films by country of production